Lisfranc may refer to:

Jacques Lisfranc de St. Martin (17901847), French surgeon and gynecologist
Lisfranc injury
Lisfranc joint
Lisfranc ligament